Manuela is a 1976 Spanish drama film directed by Gonzalo García Pelayo and starring Charo López, Fernando Rey and Máximo Valverde.

References

External links

1976 films
Spanish drama films
1970s Spanish-language films
1976 drama films
1970s Spanish films